Kottayam Kolacase is a 1967 Indian Malayalam-language film, directed by K. S. Sethumadhavan and produced by T. E. Vasudevan. The film stars Prem Nazir, Sheela, Adoor Bhasi and Sankaradi. It was released on 22 March 1967.

Plot

Cast 
Prem Nazir
Sheela
Adoor Bhasi
Sankaradi
G. K. Pillai
Indira Priyadarsini
Kamaladevi
Kottarakkara Sreedharan Nair
Santha Devi

Soundtrack 
The music was composed by B. A. Chidambaranath and the lyrics were written by Vayalar Ramavarma.

References

External links 
 

1960s Malayalam-language films
1967 films
Films directed by K. S. Sethumadhavan